Bianca Gisler (born 15 February 2003) is a Swiss snowboarder.

She competed at the 2022 Winter Olympics, in Women's big air, and Women's slopestyle.

She competed at the 2020–21 FIS Freestyle Ski World Cup, and 2021–22 FIS Freestyle Ski World Cup.

References

External links
 

2003 births
Living people
Swiss female snowboarders
Olympic snowboarders of Switzerland
Snowboarders at the 2022 Winter Olympics
People from Maloja District
Snowboarders at the 2020 Winter Youth Olympics
Sportspeople from Graubünden
21st-century Swiss women
Youth Olympic bronze medalists for Switzerland
Medalists at the 2020 Winter Youth Olympics